Hoedown is a 1950 American Western film directed by Ray Nazarro and written by Barry Shipman. The film stars Eddy Arnold, Jeff Donnell, Jock Mahoney, Guinn "Big Boy" Williams and Carolina Cotton. The film was released on June 1, 1950, by Columbia Pictures.

Plot

Cast
Eddy Arnold as Eddy Arnold
Jeff Donnell as Vera Wright
Jock Mahoney as Stoney Rhodes
Guinn "Big Boy" Williams as Small Potatoes
Carolina Cotton as Carolina Cotton
Hal Hopper as Member of The Pied Pipers 
June Hutton as Member of The Pied Pipers 
Chuck Lowry as Member of The Pied Pipers 
Clark Yocum as Member of The Pied Pipers 
Guy Willis as Member of The Oklahoma Wranglers
Skeeter Willis as Fiddle Player
Vic Wills as Member of The Oklahoma Wranglers
Chuck Wright as Bass Player

References

External links
 

1950 films
1950s English-language films
American Western (genre) films
1950 Western (genre) films
Columbia Pictures films
Films directed by Ray Nazarro
American black-and-white films
1950s American films